Events in the year 1905 in Brazil.

Incumbents

Federal government
President: Francisco de Paula Rodrigues Alves 
Vice President: Afonso Pena

Governors 
 Alagoas: Antônio Máximo da Cunha Rego (till 1 November), Antônio Máximo da Cunha Rego (from 1 November)
 Amazonas: Antônio Constantino Néri
 Bahia: José Marcelino de Sousa
 Ceará: Antônio Nogueira Accioli
 Goiás:
 until July 14: José Xavier de Almeida
 from July 14: Miguel da Rocha Lima
 Maranhão: Manuel Lopes da Cunha
 Mato Grosso: Antônio Pais de Barros
 Minas Gerais: Francisco Salles
 Pará: Augusto Montenegro
 Paraíba: 
 until 28 October: Álvaro Lopes Machado
 from 28 October: Valfredo Leal
 Paraná: Vicente Machado da Silva Lima
 Pernambuco: Sigismundo Antônio Gonçalves
 Piauí: Álvaro de Assis Osório Mendes
 Rio Grande do Norte: Augusto Tavares Lira
 Rio Grande do Sul: Antônio Augusto Borges de Medeiros
 Santa Catarina:
 São Paulo: 
 Sergipe:

Vice governors 
 Rio Grande do Norte:
 São Paulo:

Events
5 February - The football club Clube do Remo is established in Belém.
30 December - Law no. 1452 is passed by the National Congress of Brazil, authorizing expenditure of £4,214,550 for new warship construction (£1,685,820 in 1906).

Arts and culture

Books
Lima Barreto - O Subterrâneo do Morro do Castelo

Births
8 February - Preguinho, footballer (died 1979)
15 February - Waldemar Henrique, pianist and composer (died 1995)
11 May - Augusto Hamann Rademaker Grünewald, admiral (died 1985)
August 10 - Evandro Chagas, physician and biomedical scientist (died 1940)
17 December - Erico Verissimo, writer (died 1975)

Deaths
29 January - José do Patrocínio, writer, journalist, activist, orator and pharmacist (born 1854; suffered hemoptysis just after making a speech in honour of Alberto Santos-Dumont)
22 September - Suresh Biswas, Indian adventurer (born 1861;

References

See also 
1905 in Brazilian football

 
1900s in Brazil
Years of the 20th century in Brazil
Brazil
Brazil